The African Journal of AIDS Research is a peer-reviewed medical journal published by the National Inquiry Services Centre (Grahamstown, South Africa) on topics related to AIDS in Africa.

External links 
 

HIV/AIDS journals
Quarterly journals
Publications established in 2002
English-language journals
Microbiology journals
2002 establishments in South Africa